Badness is the third album released by British jazz fusion duo Morrissey–Mullen. Released in 1981, it entered the UK Album Charts on 18 July 1981, eventually reaching no. 43.

Track listing 
 "Do Like You"
 "Dragonfly"
 "Stay Awhile"
 "Blue Tears"
 "Badness"
 "Pass The Music On"
 "Slipstream"

Personnel 
 Dick Morrissey – tenor sax, soprano sax, flute
 Jim Mullen – guitar
 John Critchinson – keyboards
 Clive Chaman – bass guitar
 Chris Ainsworth - drums
 Chris Fletcher – percussion
 Linda Taylor - vocals

References

External links 
 Official Charts Company

1981 albums
Beggars Banquet Records albums
Morrissey–Mullen albums